"La France" is a 2001 song by the French hip hop band Sniper. It addresses perceived injustices committed against minorities by the French political system and the opinion that even though there is a large number of people of African and Arab origins in France, they are poorly represented in politics. The song's chorus displays the message in a rather strong way:

 La France est une garce et on s'est fait trahir
 Le système, voilà ce qui nous pousse à les haïr
 La haine, c'est ce qui rend nos propos vulgaires
 On nique la France sous une tendance de musique populaire
 On est d'accord et on se moque des répressions
 On se fout de la République et de la liberté d'expression
 Faudrait changer les lois et pouvoir voir
 Bientôt à l'Elysée des arabes et des noirs au pouvoir

In English:

 France is a bitch and we've been betrayed
 The system is what makes us hate them
 The hatred is what makes our words vulgar
 We fuck France over with the pop music
 We agree and we don't care about a repression
 We don't give a damn about the Republic or the freedom of expression
 The laws should be changed and we should see
 Arabs and Blacks in power, soon at l'Elysée,

This song was among the ones that according to the French Minister of the Interior Nicolas Sarkozy had 'violent, racist and abusive' lyrics, particularly as it contains the line "Pour mission exterminer les ministres et les fachos" ("A mission to exterminate the ministers and fascists"), "Frère, je lance un appel, on est là pour tout niquer, leur laisser des traces et des séquelles, avant de crever" and "Mon seul souhait, désormais, est de nous voir les envahir" (Now, my only wish is to see us invading them).

References

External links
 lyrics

2001 songs
Sniper (group) songs